Wolfgang Fahrian (31 May 1941 – 13 April 2022) was a German professional footballer who played as a goalkeeper.

Playing career
Having been a defender initially, Fahrian was trained as a goalkeeper following a goalkeeper shortage at TSG Ulm 1846 in the early 1960s. Although impressive in his new role, his call-up by Sepp Herberger for the West Germany national team clash against Uruguay in April 1962 caused a great stir due to the fact he was not a top-division player at that time. In the fixture he kept a clean sheet, something that saw him brought into West Germany's 1962 FIFA World Cup squad. Despite his first cap seeing an impressive performance, it was expected that Hans Tilkowski would be the undoubted first choice for Herberger's West Germany side and Fahrian would just be taken as a reserve goalkeeper. However, Fahrian shocked Germany as he was chosen to be the starting goalkeeper for all the matches in this World Cup.

However, the 1962 FIFA World Cup brought disappointing results for West Germany, reaching the Quarter-final stage, which coincided with Fahrian's faltering career from then on. Several moves later, he retired after just 67 appearances in the Bundesliga. He played for the West Germany national team until 1964, earning ten caps.

Career as a sports agent
Fahrian became a sports agent at the end of his career, finding great success in that area. In 2006, he worked as executive for ROGON Sportmanagement, one of the leading agencies in German football with clients such as Kevin Kurányi, Marcelo Bordon, Fabian Ernst, Halil Altıntop, Tim Wiese, Roque Junior and others.

Death
Fahrian died from pneumonia on 13 April 2022, aged 80.

Honours
TSV 1860 Munich
Bundesliga runner-up: 1966–67

References

External links
 
 
 
 ROGON Sportmanagement

1941 births
2022 deaths
People from Alb-Donau-Kreis
Sportspeople from Tübingen (region)
German footballers
Footballers from Baden-Württemberg
Association football goalkeepers
Germany international footballers
1962 FIFA World Cup players
Bundesliga players
2. Bundesliga players
SSV Ulm 1846 players
Hertha BSC players
TSV 1860 Munich players
Fortuna Düsseldorf players
SC Fortuna Köln players